Margarita Vasilieva (Bulgarian: Маргарита Василева; born 30 May 2005) is a Bulgarian rhythmic gymnast. She is world champion with the Bulgarian team in All-around at the world championship 2022 in Sofia and world champion in final with 3 ribbons+2balls. She won gold in the senior team competition at the 2022 European Championships.

Personal life 
She started to train in rhythmic gymnastics when she was 7, encouraged by her mother. Her idol is former group captain Simona Dyankova and her goal is to become Olympic champion.

Career 
Vasileva was selected for the Bulgarian junior group in 2017, winning medals internationally, but failing to do so in important meets such as the junior European and World Championship.

Senior 
In 2022, when the girls of the previous senior group retired after becoming Olympic champions, Vasileva became a starter in the two routines since the World Cup in Pesaro, where the group won silver in the All-Around and  3 ribbons + 2 balls and bronze with 5 hoops. She also took part in the stages of Pamplona (bronze with 5 hoops and silver with  3 ribbons + 2 balls) and Cluji-Napoca (All-Around, 5 hoops and 3 ribbons + 2 balls gold). In June she was part of the group for the European Championship in Tel Aviv, she won gold in the senior team category along with Vaya Draganova, Zhenina Trashlieva, Sofia Ivanova, Rachel Stoyanov, Kamelia Petrova and the individuals Boryana Kaleyn and Stiliana Nikolova.

References 

 

2005 births
Living people
Bulgarian rhythmic gymnasts
Medalists at the Rhythmic Gymnastics European Championships
Gymnasts from Sofia
Medalists at the Rhythmic Gymnastics World Championships